Lutilabria is a genus of moths in the family Gelechiidae.

Species
Lutilabria kaszabi Povolný, 1978
Lutilabria lutilabrella (Mann, 1857)
Lutilabria prolata Junnilainen & Nupponen, 2010
Lutilabria volgensis Anikin & Piskunov, 1996

Former species
Lutilabria olympica Huemer, 1993

References

 , 1993: Bemerkungen zu den palarktischen Arten der Gattung Lutilabria Povolný (Lepidoptera, Gelechiidae). Deutsche Entomologische Zeitschrift 40(2): 341-347. Abstract: .
 ;  2010: The gelechiid fauna of the southern Ural Mountains, part I: descriptions of seventeen new species (Lepidoptera: Gelechiidae). Zootaxa, 2366: 1–34. Preview

 
Gnorimoschemini